Rengel is a surname of Swiss German or Spanish origin. Notable people with the surname include:

Juan Jacinto Muñoz Rengel (born 1974), Spanish writer
Peter Rengel (born 1987), Slovak footballer
Soleidys Rengel (born 1993), Venezuelan footballer

References

Swiss-German surnames
Surnames of Spanish origin